Mess Búachalla (the cow-herder's foundling)  is the mother of the High King Conaire Mór in Irish mythology. Her origins are somewhat confused. In the tale Tochmarc Étaíne she is the daughter of the High King Eochu Airem and his own daughter, whom he slept with after being fooled into believing she was her mother Étaín. (In the Banshenchas Eochu and Étaín's daughter is named as Esa).  In Togail Bruidne Dá Derga, she is the daughter of Eochu's brother Eochu Feidlech and Étaín herself. Because of her incestuous conception her father orders her exposed, but she is found and brought up by a herdsman and his wife. She grows up to be very beautiful, and is forcibly married by the High King Eterscél. One night, in Eterscél's house, she is visited by an unknown man who flies in her skylight in the form of a bird, and she has his son, Conaire Mór, who is brought up as Eterscél's son.

References

Cycles of the Kings